Christian H. Kälin or Kaelin (born 1971) is a Swiss lawyer, an author, and the chairman of Henley & Partners, an architect of citizenship-by-investment programs that allow wealthy individuals to obtain additional passports. Dubbed the "Passport King" by the media, he is credited with making citizenship by investment "a legitimate, largely above-board industry".  

Kälin has written a number of works on the subject of citizenship by investment. He is the author of the Global Residence and Citizenship Handbook and the co-author of the Quality of Nationality Index. He also wrote the monograph Ius Doni in International Law and EU Law on citizenship by investment.

Early life and education
Kälin was born in 1971 in Zürich. In his teenage years, he began collecting immigration and citizenship laws from different countries, writing to embassies to request copies of their legislation and keeping the documents in a big binder. He told writer and journalist Atossa Araxia Abrahamian of this time in his life: "What always fascinated me was the inclusionary and exclusionary aspect of citizenship .... I wanted to understand how different countries handled this." 

Kälin studied in Paris, Auckland, and Zurich. He earned master's and PhD degrees in law from the University of Zurich. His doctoral thesis was published under the title Ius Doni: The Acquisition of Citizenship by Investment. In the thesis, he wrote in support of citizenship by investment, arguing that it "creates social and economic development opportunities for States." He also coined the term ius doni, referring to people who gain citizenship through investment.

Career
In 1994 he joined Henley & Partners, initially as a consultant. There, he pioneered the concept of "citizenship by investment", whereby people can acquire citizenship in return for investing in a country of which they are not a national. Kälin makes a distinction between citizenship that can be "earned" through investment that is economically beneficial to a country, and "commodified" citizenship which can be simply bought, claiming that only the former method can be seen as legitimate. He also considers that "citizenship is inherently unjust".

In 2006, Kälin published the first edition of the Switzerland Business & Investment Handbook, a comprehensive guide to doing business in Switzerland that is said to be found in every Swiss embassy around the world. In the same year, he created the Henley Passport Index, which ranks countries according to the travel freedom their citizens enjoy due to their passport.

Kälin and Henley & Partners have worked with the governments of Antigua and Barbuda, Austria, Australia, Cyprus, Greece, Grenada, Malta, Montenegro, Saint Kitts and Nevis, Saint Lucia, and Thailand. 

Kälin was the lead consultant in the creation and implementation of the citizenship-by-investment program of Antigua and Barbuda in 2013. In 2014, Kälin was appointed chairman of Henley & Partners following many years in different senior roles at the firm.

In collaboration with Dimitry Kochenov, Kälin authors The Quality of Nationality Index (QNI), an annual report published since 2015. The index ranks the quality of nationalities based on factors such as GDP, Human Development Index and freedom to travel and settle abroad.

Kälin is a member of the governing board of the Investment Migration Council in Geneva. He is also the founder and chairman of the Switzerland-based Andan Foundation, which focuses on supporting displaced people.

Saint Kitts and Nevis 
In 2006, Kälin restructured the Saint Kitts and Nevis citizenship-by-investment program, and obtained exclusive rights for Henley to market St. Kitts and Nevis worldwide. The company gave the country's government a $20,000 fee for every successful applicant for its passport program. Applicants for passports could either invest in real state on the islands or donate to the Sugar Industry Diversification Foundation, which was intended to invest on behalf of the St. Kitts and Nevis population. The contract between Henley and Partners and St. Kitts and Nevis ended in 2013. In 2014, the US and Canada flagged that St. Kitts and Nevis had allowed financial criminals and individuals evading sanctions to obtain passports through the Henley and Partners program; Canada ended its visa-free agreement with St. Kitts and Nevis. In 2015, the head of an International Monetary Fund mission to St. Kitts and Nevis said that the citizenship-by-investment program improved by Kälin led to the country out-performing other Caribbean nations in its recovery from the global financial crisis.

Personal life
According to Atossa Araxia Abrahamian, Kälin possesses at least five passports personally. When asked by The Economist in 2017, Kälin declined to reveal how many passports he has.

Publications

Kälin – Kochenov Quality of Nationality Index
Global Residence and Citizenship Programs 2017–2018: The Definitive Comparison of the Leading Investment Migration Programs (Christian H. Kälin) for Henley & Partners
Ius Doni: The Acquisition of Citizenship by Investment (Christian H. Kälin)
"Investment Migration: The New Competitive Edge" (Christian H. Kälin) in The International Family Offices Journal (December 2017)
"New Citizenship Options Will Open Up" (Christian H. Kälin) in the 2017 Knight Frank Wealth Report
"Only as Strong as Their Weakest Link" (Christian H. Kälin) in the 2018 Knight Frank Wealth Report
"Swiss Companies in International Tax Planning" (Christian H. Kälin) in Trust and Trustees, volume 11, issue 10 (October 2005)
A Guide to Investment Migration for Governments and Global Citizens (Christian H. Kälin) for Henley & Partners, in partnership with the Economist Group (April 2018)
"Malta's Due Diligence Will Become the Global Standard" (Christian H. Kälin) for Investment Migration Insider (May 2018)
"Consolidation Will Drive the Industry Forward" (Christian H. Kälin) for Investment Migration Yearbook 2018/2019
Ius Doni in International Law and EU Law (Christian H. Kälin)
"How Dual Citizenship Can Define Your Future" (Christian H. Kälin) in IFC Review (2016)
Investment Migration Yearbook 2021/2022 (Christian H. Kälin, ed.) for Investment Migration Council

References

Living people
University of Zurich alumni
Swiss chief executives
Swiss chairpersons of corporations
20th-century Swiss lawyers
1971 births
2019 Malta political crisis
21st-century Swiss lawyers